Project Pop is an Indonesian comedic co-ed group from Bandung. Founded in 1996 as a younger generation of Project-P, they distinguished themselves by writing original music. Their first album, Bakpia vs Lumpia was a commercial and critical failure, but beginning with their 2000 album Tu Wa Ga Pat they found mainstream success. Drawing on current musical trends when writing their songs, they have done songs in pop, dangdut, soul, rock, house, and rap. , they have released nine albums.

History
Project Pop was founded in 1996 as a spinoff of Project-P, a previous comedic band. Although originally consisting of seven members, only six remain: Hermann Josis Mokalu (Yosi), Muhammad Fachroni (O'on), Djoni Permato (Udjo), Gumilar Nurochman (Gugum), Wahyu Rudi Astadi (Odie), and Kartika Rachel Setia Redjeki Panggabean (Tika; the only female member). Aside from Gugum, who attended Padjadjaran University, all attended Parahyangan Catholic University.

Project Pop soon distinguished themselves from Project-P by writing their own songs, instead of parodying then-popular songs. Their first album, Bakpia vs Lumpia, was not well received. After a hiatus brought on by the 1997 Asian financial crisis, they released their second album, 2000's Tu Wa Ga Pat (short for Satu Dua Tiga Empat or One Two Three Four), which was well received. Hera Diani of The Jakarta Post described it as being full of "contagious pop tunes and comical, yet witty lyrics."

This success was followed by a "repackage[d]" album, Bli Dong Plis (Buy This, Please) in 2001, with "Jangan Piki-Piki" ("Don't Be Picky") becoming a hit. Two years later this was followed by Pop OK, which sold 300,000 copies and was certified double platinum. In 2004 they collaborated with soloist Chrisye on the song "Bur-Kat" for his album Senyawa.

In 2005, Project Pop released Pop Circus; the music video for "Jangan Ganggu Banci" ("Don't Bother Transvestite!") went on to win MTV Indonesia's video clip of the year. Two years later they released Six-A-Six, with metal and disco influences.

In 2008, Project Pop released their seventh album, Top of Pop. 2009 saw Project Pop release their eighth album, You Got. The title is an acronym of their stage names.

In 2016, upon hearing news of O'on's sickness, Project Pop released an exclusive single called "Cepat Sembuh" ("Get Well Soon").

On 13 January 2017, one of Project Pop's members, O'on, died of complications of diabetes at his residence in Bandung. This left Project Pop with five members.

Style
Project Pop's song are generally about current issues, but presented with "humorous lyrics and  playful melodies". Their musical genre changes with what is trending; for example, "Bur-Kat" was rap inspired, while  their 2003 song "Dangdut is the Music of My Country" (Pop OK Album) was a mix of then-trending Linkin Park-style rock and dangdut. They have done songs in pop, dangdut, soul, rock, house, and rap.

Originally, the band focused on the comedic aspects of their songs, writing songs about "food and martial arts fighters". However, due to pressures caused by the switch to ringback tones as the main sales media and a concern that their songs were "funny but not lasting", they switched to more overt messages, understandable within a 30-second clip.

Performances
Project Pop often performs live, at traditional music venues as well as birthday parties and campaign and product events.

Each member has their own strengths. In a 2001 interview with The Jakarta Post, Udjo stated that Yosi came up with the concepts, Gugum kept spontaneous, and Tika gauged the audience's mood.

Discography
, Project Pop has released nine albums
Bakpia vs Lumpia (August 1996)
Tu Wa Ga Pat (One Two Three Four; November 2000)
Bli Dong Plis (Please Buy; July 2001)
Pop OK (July 2003)
Pop Circus (August 2005)
Six-A-Six (A play on Six Asyik, meaning 'Six is Interesting'; April 2007)
Top of the Pop (September 2008)
You Got (2009)
Move On (2013)

References

Works cited

External links
Official website

Musical groups from Bandung
Musical groups established in 1996
Comedy musical groups
1996 establishments in Indonesia
Anugerah Musik Indonesia winners